Shamsabad (also Romanized as Shamsābād; also known as Shams Abad Ghareh Kariz) is a village in Shamsabad Rural District, in the Central District of Arak County, Markazi Province, Iran. At the 2006 census, its population was 76, in 24 families.

References 

Populated places in Arak County